The fifth legislative assembly election of Tamil Nadu was held in March 1971. Dravida Munnetra Kazhagam was re-elected, after its first victory under the leadership of C N Annadurai in 1967. This was the first time M. Karunanidhi, contested as the leader of DMK party won the election, since he assumed Chief Ministership for the first time, after the death of C N Annadurai. Karunanidhi had emerged successfully in the leadership crisis with other party leaders M. G. Ramachandran, and Nedunchezhiyan, which ensued after the death of C. N. Annadurai. The main opposition party in the election was Indian National Congress (Organisation) led by K. Kamaraj, whereas the Indian National Congress (Indira) faction aligned with Dravida Munnetra Kazhagam. This was the last election that had only 2 major parties in Tamilnadu. After the election, MGR was slowly cornered out of DMK, and finally he formed AIADMK, which has since then been the close equal of DMK.

Background 
The opposition party, Indian National Congress was heavily weakened due to a split that occurred in 1969. This led to the formation of Indian National Congress (Organisation) under K. Kamaraj, which was the major opposition in this election, while the Indian National Congress, supported the Dravida Munnetra Kazhagam. 
Indira Gandhi continued as Prime Minister with the support of Communist parties and DMK which had 25 seats in the Lok Sabha. It was during this time, the long-awaited Salem steel mill was approved. The ruling Congress party decided to dissolve the Lok Sabha and conduct early elections and Karunanidhi also decided to dissolve the state assembly and face the elections in alliance with Indira's Congress one year before the end of his term.

Parties and alliances
Dravida Munnetra Kazhagam formed a seven party alliance called Left and Democratic Front (Progressive Front). The front was led by the DMK and comprised Indian National Congress (Indira), Communist Party of India (CPI), the Praja Socialist Party, the Forward Block, the Muslim League and M. P. Sivagnanam's Tamil National Party. The Congress party dependent on DMK votes in the Lok Sabha for survival had no influence in the seating arrangements. The Indira Congress contested in 9 out of 39 parliamentary constituencies but not in legislative assembly constituencies. Indira Gandhi instructed the leader of the Tamil Nadu Congress, Subramaniam to accept the arrangement in a sign indicative of writing off Tamil Nadu as a Congress territory.

The opposition front was a coalition of Kamaraj led Indian National Congress (Organisation) (Congress (O)), Rajaji's Swatantara Party, Samyukta Socialist Party, the Tamil Nadu Toilers' Party, the Republican Party and the Coimbatore District Agriculturist Association.

Voting and results

Results
Source: Election Commission of India

Karunanidhi's Cabinet 
The council of ministers in M. Karunanidhi's cabinet (in 1971).

List of elected members

See also 
Elections in Tamil Nadu
Legislature of Tamil Nadu
Government of Tamil Nadu

Footnotes

External links
 Election Commission of India

Tamil Nadu Legislative Assembly